Acoustic is the seventeenth studio album by Scottish rock band Simple Minds, released in November 2016 by Caroline International. The album features acoustic studio recordings of previously released songs. It received mixed reviews.

Background
The genesis of Acoustic can be traced back to a rare live session the band recorded for the BBC Radio Two's Chris Evans Breakfast Show on 26 September 2014, then promoting their 16th studio album, Big Music. To the band's surprise, the reaction was overwhelmingly favourable.

The band performed acoustic sets during some other one-off live appearances (radio sessions or showcase events) including one held on 22 November 2014 in Paris by French radio station RTL notable for a rare outing of "Mandela Day".

Besides Kerr and Burchill the band consists of Ged Grimes (bass), Sarah Brown (backing vocals), Gordy Goudie (guitars) and Cherisse Osei (drums).

Singles 
The acoustic version of "Promised You a Miracle", featuring Scottish singer-songwriter KT Tunstall, was released on 28 September 2016.

Commercial performance 
The album debuted at number 16 on the UK Albums Chart, selling 10,427 units, and becoming Simple Minds' 14th top 20 album.

Critical reception 
The album received mixed reviews, with Timothy Monger from AllMusic noting that the band "missed out on an opportunity to dramatically shake up their repertoire". Andy Gill in The Independent found it "a welcome spring clean" and noted the folk influences. David Quantick, writing for Classic Rock, described it as "a strange album, seeking as it does to homogenise the Minds’ ever-changing sound" but concluded that it was "a consistent collection", highlighting the Richard Hawley cover "Long Black Train" as "movingly effective".

Track listing

Standard edition

Double LP bonus tracks 

Notes
Two different formats are released: a single compact-disc version and a double LP version including 3 exclusive extra tracks, the latter released only on 25 November 2016.

Personnel
Simple Minds
Jim Kerr – vocals
Charlie Burchill – guitar, accordion, programming, arrangements
Ged Grimes – bass, backing vocals 
Gordy Goudie – guitar, harmonica, additional arrangements
Sarah Brown – backing vocals
Cherisse Osei – percussion
 Additional personnel
KT Tunstall – vocals, guitar, bass, backing vocal arrangement on "Promised You a Miracle"
Lewis Chapman – additional percussion, programming 
Andy Wright – producer, programming 
Gavin Goldberg – producer, engineer, mixing, programming 
Simple Minds – producer
Jean-Pierre Chalbos – mastering
Stuart Crouch Creative – art direction, design 
Ruth Rowland – handlettering
Alan Wild – photography 
Eric Misko – photography 
Paul Cox – photography 
Paul Khera – photography

Charts

Weekly charts

Year-end charts

Certifications

Notes

References 

2016 albums
Simple Minds albums